The Bismarck sharp-nosed blind snake (Acutotyphlops subocularis) is a species of snake in the Typhlopidae family. It is found in the Bismarck Archipelago and the Solomon Islands.

References

Acutotyphlops
Endemic fauna of the Solomon Islands
Reptiles described in 1897
Reptiles of the Solomon Islands